Femmes... et Femmes (English: Women... and Women) is a 1999 Moroccan comedy drama film directed by Saâd Chraïbi. The film inaugurated a trilogy devoted to the condition of Moroccan women and dealt with the subjects of domestic violence and gender inequality. At the time, the film broke all Moroccan box office records, selling 72,138 tickets in its first week. The film would go on to win three prizes at the 5th National Film Festival in Casablanca.

Synopsis 
Zakia, Leila, Keltoum and Ghita, four women from the city, reunite after years of separation. The film follows their intersecting destinies as they fight to regain their status and place in society.

Cast 

 Mouna Fettou
 Fatema Khair
 Touria Alaoui
 Salima Benmoumen
 Hamid Basket
 Touria Jabrane

References 

Moroccan comedy films
Moroccan drama films